Danuta Róża Pietraszewska, née Sitek (born 8 May 1947 in Ruda Śląska, Poland) is a Polish politician. She was elected to the Sejm on 25 September 2005, receiving 9,841 votes in 31 Katowice district, as a candidate from the Platforma Obywatelska (Civic Platform) list.

See also

List of Sejm members (2005–2007)

External links
Danuta Pietraszewska — parliamentary page — includes declarations of interest, voting record, and transcripts of speeches.

1947 births
Living people
People from Ruda Śląska
Civic Platform politicians
Members of the Polish Sejm 2005–2007
Members of the Polish Sejm 2007–2011
Members of the Polish Sejm 2011–2015
Members of the Polish Sejm 2015–2019
Women members of the Sejm of the Republic of Poland
21st-century Polish women politicians